Following is the list of cultural heritage sites in Muzaffargarh, Pakistan. The list also includes  UNESCO World Heritage Site in the dictrict . The provincial government passed the Punjab Special Premises (Preservation) Ordinance, 1985 under which 272 sites have been protected by January 2013. many of these buildings are in Muzaffargarh.

Protected sites 
Following is the list of sites protected by the Federal Government of Pakistan.

|}

Special premises 
The monuments below have been declared Special Premises (protected site) by the Government of Punjab under the 1985 Ordinance.

|}

Unprotected Sites 

|}

References 

Buildings and structures in Punjab, Pakistan
Archaeological sites in Pakistan
Cultural heritage sites in Punjab, Pakistan
Buildings and structures in Muzaffargarh
Muzaffargarh-related lists
Culture in Muzaffargarh